Fernando Lucas Martins (born March 3, 1992), more commonly known as Fernando, is a Brazilian footballer who plays as defensive midfielder for Antalyaspor.

Club career

Shakhtar Donetsk
On 13 June 2013, Fernando signed a five-year contract with Shakhtar Donetsk. The transfer fee was reported to be 11 million Euro.

Sampdoria
On 6 July 2015 Fernando was signed by Italian Serie A club U.C. Sampdoria for €8 million. He made 33 league appearances, scoring four goals, for the club.

Spartak Moscow
On 19 July 2016, Sampdoria confirmed that Fernando had been sold to Russian club Spartak Moscow for around €12 million.

Beijing Sinobo Guoan
On 30 July 2019, Spartak Moscow confirmed that Fernando left for Chinese Super League side Beijing Guoan. Beijing announced that he joined the team on loan a day later to help provide cover for sidelined Jonathan Viera.

Antalyaspor
On January 17, 2022, he has signed with Turkish club Antalyaspor.

International career
In 2012, Fernando was called up by Brazil for matches against Iraq on October 12 and Japan on October 16.

Fernando was part of the 23 players called by coach Luiz Felipe Scolari to play in the 2013 FIFA Confederations Cup on home soil.

Personal life
Fernando became known for the "Robson case", in which he asked his driver Robson Oliveira to take a methadone-based medicine for his father-in-law in Russia, in February 2019. However, the medicine is prohibited by Russian law, and the driver was arrested for international drug trafficking. Fernando never helped the driver. Facing a maximum of 12 years, Oliveira was sentenced to three years in prison in December 2020, followed by deportation.

Career statistics

Club

Notes

International

Honours

Club
Grêmio
Campeonato Gaúcho: 2010

Shakhtar Donetsk
Ukrainian League: 2013–14
Ukrainian Super Cup: 2014

Spartak Moscow
Russian Premier League: 2016–17
Russian Super Cup: 2017

International
Brazil U17
South American Under-17 Football Championship: 2009

Brazil U20
South American Youth Championship: 2011
FIFA U-20 World Cup: 2011

Brazil
FIFA Confederations Cup: 2013

References

External links

Grêmio 
Fernando at Topforward

1992 births
Living people
2013 FIFA Confederations Cup players
Antalyaspor footballers
Association football midfielders
Beijing Guoan F.C. players
Brazil international footballers
Brazil under-20 international footballers
Brazil youth international footballers
Brazilian expatriate footballers
Brazilian expatriate sportspeople in China
Brazilian expatriate sportspeople in Italy
Brazilian expatriate sportspeople in Russia
Brazilian expatriate sportspeople in Ukraine
Brazilian footballers
Campeonato Brasileiro Série A players
Chinese Super League players
Expatriate footballers in China
Expatriate footballers in Italy
Expatriate footballers in Russia
Expatriate footballers in Ukraine
FC Shakhtar Donetsk players
FC Spartak Moscow players
FIFA Confederations Cup-winning players
Grêmio Foot-Ball Porto Alegrense players
People from Erechim
Russian Premier League players
Serie A players
U.C. Sampdoria players
Ukrainian Premier League players
Sportspeople from Rio Grande do Sul